Michael J. Silverstein (born 1955) is an American business consultant and author.  He is an independent private equity investor and chairman of several startup enterprises, including Coterie Diaper and Hand IQ.

Career 

Silverstein was a senior partner and managing director at The Boston Consulting Group.  He was one of the founders of the firm's global consumer practice and is known for his expertise in consumer behavior, retail, and marketing, particularly as it relates to the female economy.
He is the author of Trading Up: The New American Luxury, Treasure Hunt: Inside the Mind of the New Consumer,  Women Want More: How to Capture Your Share of the World's Largest Fastest-Growing Market, and The Ten Trillion Dollar Prize: Captivating the Newly Affluent in China and India. He is a regular contributor to Bloomberg Television.

See also 
The Boston Consulting Group

Bibliography 
Silverstein, Michael J.; Bolden, Dylan; Jacobsen, Rune; Sajdeh, Rohan (2015).  "Rocket:  Eight Lessons to Secure Infinite Growth" McGraw Hill Education. 
Silverstein, Michael J.; Abheek Singhi, Carol Liao, David Michael (2012). The $10 Trillion Prize: Captivating the Newly Affluent in China and India. Harvard Business Review Press. .
Silverstein, Michael J.; Kate Sayre, John Butman (2009). Women Want More: How to Capture Your Share of the World's Largest, Fastest-Growing Market. HarperBusiness. .
Silverstein, Michael J.; John Butman (2006). Treasure Hunt: Inside the Mind of the New Consumer. Portfolio. .
Silverstein, Michael J.; John Butman (2003). Trading Up: Why Consumers Want New Luxury Goods--and How Companies Create Them. Portfolio Trade. .

References 

Living people
1955 births
Harvard Business School alumni
Businesspeople from Chicago
Brown University alumni
American consulting businesspeople
20th-century American businesspeople